The Salzburg Connection is a 1968 spy novel by the British-born writer Helen MacInnes. A British intelligence agent attempts to retrieve a box hidden in Austria containing the names of a list of Nazi collaborators left over from the war. Before long several other agencies are also after the prize.

Reception 
A book review in The New York Times described the novel as "a fascinating exercise in wide-screen spymanship."

The book was a commercial success. It ranked third among the top ten best-selling works of fiction in the United States for the year 1968, according to Publishers Weekly.

Film adaptation 
In 1972 the novel was adapted into a film of the same title directed by Lee H. Katzin and starring Barry Newman and Anna Karina.

References

Bibliography 
 Goble, Alan. The Complete Index to Literary Sources in Film. Walter de Gruyter, 1999.

1968 British novels
British thriller novels
Novels by Helen MacInnes
British spy novels
British novels adapted into films
Novels set in Austria
Harcourt (publisher) books